John Coates Carter (1859–1927) was an English architect. Born in Norwich, Carter is notable for his design and restoration to churches in South Wales, and in particular Glamorgan. He was partnered with John Pollard Seddon from 1884 to 1904 and after he maintained a style steeped in the traditions of the Arts and Crafts Movement to create impressive buildings such as the monastery on Caldey Island and St Luke's Church in Abercarn.

Biography
John Coates Carter was born and raised in Norwich and articled to the local architect J.B. Pearce, who was notable for designing the Town Hall at Great Yarmouth. Carter later became a pupil of, and then assistant to, London-based architect John Pollard Seddon. Seddon had previously been in partnership with John Prichard between 1852 and 1863 and the two had made an impact in bringing a Neo-Gothic style to many churches in Wales, including a major restoration project to Llandaff Cathedral.

In 1884 Carter and Seddon became partners and in 1889, after working independently on St Catherine at Melincryddan in Neath, Carter was given an office in Cardiff from where he was responsible for the design of many churches in the area. That year the two men undertook two commissions, All Saints in Penarth and St Paul in Grangetown. Both buildings were modelled on Bodley's St Augustine in Pendlebury; tall and elegant with unbroken internal spaces. Although All Saints no longer exists in its original form, St Paul is described in Newman's The Buildings of Wales: Glamorgan as "...the finest late Victorian church in the county after Bodley's at Roath." Other churches in Glamorgan by Seddon & Carter, at New Tredegar and Adamsdown are conversely described as being "cheap and simple" with little to reveal the architects' true abilities. Carter was also noted for his work on reredos in several churches, including at St Mary in Bridgend (1921), the Church of the Ascension in North End, Portsmouth (1921) and St Andrew and St Teilo (1924) in Cathays.

In 1904 Carter split from Seddon and began working on his own account. Notable designs as a sole designer include the expressionist All Saints' parish hall in Penarth (1906), a Rhenish-style monastery on Caldey island (1907–13) and St Lukes, a striking stone and concrete church at Abercarn (1923). In 1916 he closed his Cardiff office and retired to Prestbury, becoming church warden at St Mary's, the local church where he is memorialised. After the end of the First World War, Carter began designing buildings again. It was during this period that Carter, a recognised exponent of the Arts and Crafts movement, began looking to the past to design churches that ignored modernity and produced a handful of churches that used local materials and identifiable Welsh vernacular motifs.

Style
Carter began his career from a Gothic base which gradually changed throughout his career when he embraced the Arts and Crafts movement, through to a style of his own. His early religious buildings were a mixture of his own creative language, the vernacular architecture of the region and the high Anglicanism favoured by his clients. During his early period, Carter was highly influenced by both Seddon and Bodley, from whom he inherited a form of 'modern Gothic. During his partnership with Seddon, Carter began to be influenced by William Morris and the Arts and Crafts movement. This can be seen in his 1902 'Red House' (influenced by Morris' own Red House) in Penarth where Carter lived for sometime. Carter was further influenced by the contemporary developments in mainland Europe and the United States, producing a style characterised as "a kind of Arts & Crafts expressionism".

Towards the end of his career, Carter looked to the past to create buildings fitting to the landscape. His swansong, St Teloi in Llandeloy, is an evocation of a small medieval Welsh church. Rejecting his earlier Gothic leanings, Carter created a church in the Arts and Crafts style with a slate roof, walls of roughly pointed local stone and small windows.

Works

Notes

Bibliography
 

1859 births
1927 deaths
19th-century English architects
Arts and Crafts movement artists
20th-century English architects
English ecclesiastical architects
Architects from Norwich